Euphorion may refer to:

 Euphorion (playwright) (fifth century BC), Attic tragic playwright and son of Aeschylus
 Euphorion of Chalcis (born c. 275 BC), Greek poet and grammarian
 Euphorion (mythology), son of Achilles and Helen of Troy
 Euphorion, a character in Goethe's Faust, Part 2, the offspring of Faust and Helen of Troy
 Euphorion (journal), a German-language academic journal of literary studies
 Euphorion Books, a publishing company formed by Diana Mosley and her husband, Sir Oswald Mosley, publisher of The European (1953 magazine)

fr:Eschyle#Éléments biographiques